Bojan Kumer (born 30 July 1974) is a Slovenian politician. He serves as the minister of infrastructure of the Republic of Slovenia since 2022.

Early life and career 
Bojan Kumer was born in Slovenj Gradec on 30 July 1974. He attended the University of Ljubljana where he studied electrical engineering. He holds a Bachelor of Science in electrical engineering and also a master's degree in the same field.

In 2001, he worked at Elektro Celje where he served as the head of the procurement and sale of electricity. He was subsequently appointed head of the unit, and thereafter the executive director of Elektro Celje. In 2009, he was appointed project manager of GEN Energija in charge of development of operations abroad. In 2010, he became the head of service for sales. In 2013, he was appointed general secretary at the Ministry of Infrastructure by the Government of the Republic of Slovenia. While serving as general secretary, he was appointed executive director of Elektro energija. Subsequently, he assumed a position as sales director of GEN-I in 2018.

In September 2018, he was reassigned as the state secretary at the Ministry of Infrastructure in the government of Marjan Šarec. On 1 June 2022, he was appointed Minister of Infrastructure in the government of Robert Golob.

References 

1974 births
Living people
21st-century Slovenian politicians
Infrastructure ministers of Slovenia
People from Slovenj Gradec
University of Ljubljana alumni